Dine may refer to:

People named Dine
 Jim Dine (born 1935), American pop artist
 S. S. Van Dine (1888–1939), art critic and author
 Dine Abduramanov (19th-century–1902), known as Dine Abduramana, was a Bulgarian revolutionary, a worker of the Internal Macedonian-Adrianople Revolutionary Organization (IMARO)
 Fiqri Dine (died 1960), Prime Minister of Albania's Quisling government under Nazi Germany and chieftain of the Dine clan from Debar
 Spiro Dine (1846–1922), Albanian rilindas, writer and playwright; his most known work "Waves of the Sea" was at the time of its publication the longest book printed in Albanian
 Thomas Dine, chief executive officer of the Jewish Community Federation of San Francisco, the Peninsula, Marin and Sonoma Counties
 Dine Penger, a private Norwegian finance magazine, established in 1983 by Carl Johan Berg and Carsten O
 "Dine Øjne", a single by Danish singer Jon Nørgaard, from his third studio album Uden dig, released in Denmark as a digital download on 7 March 2011 and peaked at number 14 on the Danish Singles Chart

Other uses
 Beit ed-Dine, a town in Lebanon
 Diné, name for the Navajo Nation in the Navajo language
 Dine Alone Records, an independent record label
 Dine and dash, failing to pay for a restaurant meal
 Diné College, a community college serving the Navajo Indian Reservation
 Dine's compensation, a principle in meteorology

See also
 Diné, an indigenous people in the Southwestern US
 Dyne, a unit of force
 Dyne (name)